Gogoyan is a hamlet in the  community of Llanddewibrefi, Ceredigion, Wales, which is 58.9 miles (94.8 km) from Cardiff and 171.1 miles (275.3 km) from London. Gogoyan is represented in the Senedd by Elin Jones (Plaid Cymru) and the Member of Parliament is Ben Lake (Plaid Cymru).

See also
Llanddewi Brefi - Pont Gogoyan, a grade II* listed structure over the River Teifi.
List of localities in Wales by population

References

Villages in Ceredigion